The Rough River Lake is a Y-shaped reservoir located in Breckinridge, Hardin, and Grayson counties in Kentucky, about 70 miles southwest of Louisville. This lake was created by the building of a dam, begun in 1955 and completed in 1961, 89.3 miles above the connection between the Rough River and the Green River. The land and water, along with the wildlife, fisheries, and recreational activities, are all managed under the cooperation of the U.S. Army Corps of Engineers and the Commonwealth of Kentucky. A primary attraction is Rough River Dam State Resort Park.

Lake Size 
As the seasons change during the year so does the size of the Rough River Lake, during the summer months the lake is about 5,100 acers, has 220 miles of shoreline, is 39 miles long, and is 65 feet deep in the deepest portion of the lake which included the area around the dam. In contrast to the summer months during the winter the lake decreases to 2,180 acers at an elevation of 470.

Marinas and Boat Ramp Information 
On the Rough River Lake there are three main marinas: Bill's Marina, Rough River Dam Marina, and finally Nicks Boat Dock. Bill's Marina is open during the boating season, which is April 1 to October 15, it is 6 miles north of the Leitchfield, and has no service fees to launch a boat onto this lake. The address is 346 Peter Cave Ramp Road, Leitchfield, KY 42754. The Rough River Dam Marina is also open seasonally but this marina will stay open until October 31 if the lake levels are permitting. this marina is located adjacent to the Rough River Lake State Resort Park off KY 79, the address is 450 Lodge Road, Falls of Rough KY 40119. Lastly, Nicks Boat Dick is open from April 1 to November 30 and is 5 miles west of Mc Daniels off KY 259.

In addition of these three boating marinas there are five boat launching ramps located around the Rough River Lake. There is a 2-dollar fee to four out of the five ramps but an annual pass for these launches is 25-dollars with discounts to senior citizens.

-  Axtel boat ramp is 4 miles east of the dam, off KY 79

-  Cave Creek boat ramp is 5 miles south of the dam, off KY 736

-  Laurel branch boat ramp is 6 miles east of the dam, off KY 110

-  North Fork boat ramp is 7 miles east of the ramp, off KY 259

-  Everleigh boat ramp is in the lake headwaters, 2 miles south of Madrid, off KY 259

Fishing 
In the Rough River Lake there is a standing crop average of about 300 pounds of fish per acre, but there are some spots in the lake where the average increases. The south fork is one of those spots above Peter Cave, this area produced a larger number of bass and crappie. Both upper ends of the lakes two forks are more fertile than the lower spots around the lake. This lake supports populations of many species of fish including, largemouth bass, spotted bass, hybrid striped bass, catfish, crappie, white bass, and bluegill. In the tributaries there are a remnant population of smallmouth bass that stay in this area. There are limited tailwater fishing opportunities on the Rough River Lake, unfortunately there are no boating launches in the tailwaters and the access decreases moving down the lake due to private properties. Walleye were stocked in this lake from 1976 to 1978 but the fishery never developed so the number of these fish are very small. Rainbow trout are stocked every month but November and December, the number of Rainbow trout's average to about 11,600 fish annually.

Campgrounds 
There are four main camp sites around the Rough River Lake:

-       Axtel Camp Sites, located in Mc Daniels, Kentucky. This campsite is open starting on April 14 and has up to 158 campsites, many of them have electrical hookups along with swimming areas, a boat ramp, flush toilets, playground, showers, and drinking water provided throughout the area. These campsites range from 18 dollars to 40 dollars depending on the site chosen, there is a 10-dollars fee when a cancellation occurs, change of site, or change of dates.

-       Cave Creek Camp Sites, located in Falls of Rough, Kentucky. Caves Creek also opens on April 14 and has 65 campsites, 36 of which have electrical hookups. Due to the array of different kinds of campsites, the fees spread from 18 dollars to 40 dollars, and the fee for canceling, changing sites, and or changing dates of arrival is 10 dollars. This facility provides a dump station, playground, boat ramp, drinking water, showers, disc golf course, basketball courts, and a fishing pier.

-       Laurel Branch Camp Sites, located near Mc Daniels, Kentucky. April 14 is the opening day where Laurel Branch starts a business, and it closes October 30. This facility offers 71 campsites, most have electrical hookups and are waterfront, while others are a short walk from the lake. they also provide flush toilets, showers, playgrounds, boat ramp, drinking water, trails through the woods, a public beach, and a fish cleaning station. These campsites range from 18 dollars to 50 dollars depending on the different amenities that are chosen, the cancellation fee is 10 dollars, and if cancellation was made the day before arrival customer is also charged the first night's charge along with the 10 dollars.

-       North Fork Campsites, located near Mc Daniels, Kentucky. This campground is open from May 19 until it closes on September 5th. There are 81 campsites to choose from, 50 of them have an electrical hookup right on the campsites and many of them are right on the water. Additional amenities include flush toilets, showers, playground, boat ramp, drinking water, nature trail, public beach, and fish cleaning station. Wi-fi is available from an outside source at an additional fee.

Nearby Activities 
There are many activities to do on and around the Rough River Lake some activities include:

-       Boating

-       Camping

-       Fishing

-       Hiking

-       Picnicking

-       Water Sports

-       Wildlife Viewing

-       Swimming Site

-       Playground Parks

-       Environmental Education

References

See also
Rough River Dam State Resort Park

Infrastructure completed in 1959
Protected areas of Breckinridge County, Kentucky
Protected areas of Grayson County, Kentucky
Protected areas of Hardin County, Kentucky
Reservoirs in Kentucky
United States Army Corps of Engineers dams
Bodies of water of Breckinridge County, Kentucky
Bodies of water of Grayson County, Kentucky
Bodies of water of Hardin County, Kentucky